The 5th National People's Congress was in session from 1978 to 1983. It succeeded the 4th National People's Congress. It held five plenary sessions in this period.

The Congress passed the 1978 Constitution of the People's Republic of China and the current Constitution of the People's Republic of China in 1982.

Elected state leaders
President and Vice President: Posts abolished
Chairman of the Standing Committee of the National People's Congress: Ye Jianying
Premier of the State Council: Hua Guofeng
President of the Supreme People's Court: Jiang Hua
Procurator-General of the Supreme People's Procuratorate: Huang Huoqing

External links
 Official website of the NPC

National People's Congresses
1978 in China